Dark purple is a dark tone of purple.

See also
List of colors

References